The Anti-Fascist Committee of Cham Immigrants was an organization created by Cham Albanians, when they were expelled from Greece, with the help of the newly established communist government of Albania. It was established, during the first wave of refugees, and it aimed to make Greece allow, the returning of Chams in their homes. They organized two congresses, adopted a memorandum and sent delegates in Greece and in European allies. After three years activity, the organization did not manage, neither to re-allocate Chams in Chameria, nor to internationalize the Cham issue. Greece did not acknowledge that EDES had expelled Chams, saying that they fled and that they could return, although this was impossible. The international community did not respond to Chams plea, but they acknowledged the humanitarian disaster. Since 1947, the Committee was charged with the normalization of living situations of Cham refugees in Albania. In 1951, Chams were forcibly given the Albanian citizenship and the committee was disbanded. The Cham issue did not regain momentum until 1991, when the communist regime collapsed, and the National Political Association "Çamëria" was established.

Background

In 1913, the area of Chameria, as the whole Southern Epirus came under Greek control. The Albanian state complained that the Greek government was persecuting the Muslim Cham community, however there was no evidence of direct state persecution Muslim Chams were counted as a religious minority, and some of them were transferred to Turkey, during the 1923 population exchange, while their property was alienated by the Greek government. Orthodox Cham Albanians were counted as Greeks, and their language and Albanian heritage were under pressure of assimilation.

Following the Italian occupation of Albania in 1939, the Chams became a prominent propaganda tool for the Italians. As a result, on the eve of the Greco-Italian War, the adult male Cham population was deported by the Greek authorities to internment camps. After the occupation of Greece, some Cham Albanians collaborated with Italian and German forces, while approximately the same number participated in the Albanian and Greek resistance movements; the majority however remained uninvolved in the war. Nevertheless, in 1944, the entire Muslim Cham population was expelled from Greece, by a republican resistance group, as a result of the participation of Chams in the communist resistance group of Greece, and the collaboration with the Axis of some members of the minority. This expulsion intended to create a pure ethnic border and to facilitate the anti-communist movement in the aftermath of the war. Most of the Chams crossed the border into Albania, while others formed émigré communities in Turkey and the United States. Today, their descendants continue to live in these countries, although their religious affiliation has changed considerably in the past decades. At the same time, the Orthodox minority that remained in Greece has suffered from decades of suppression of their heritage and language.

Creation
Muslim Cham Albanians that fled in Albania, were organised as refugees by the communist-led Albanian government. The Anti-Fascist Committee of Cham Immigrants was created since 1944, as part of the Anti-Fascist National Liberation Front, led by the communists, in order to lobby for the returning of Chams in their homes and to create the facilities for their surviving in the refugee camps that were created in Albania. The new post-war Communist government of Albania took the Cham issue to the Paris Peace Conference to demand the repatriation of the Chams and the return of their property, but no answer was given. At the same time, they established refugee camps and distributed Chams throughout Albania, especially in regions like Fier, Durrës and Tirana.

Aims

Their aims were to return in their homes and to get assistance for their destroyed properties. In a six-point resolution they asked the international community:

Memorandum
Chams adopted a memorandum, in which they reacted to their expulsion. According to the document of the "Anti-Fascist Committee of Cham Immigrants", in total 2,771 Albanian civilians were killed during the 1944-1945 attacks on their villages. The breakdown is as follows: in Filiates and suburbs 1,286, in Igoumenitsa and suburbs 192, in Paramythia and suburbs 673 and Parga 620. Sixty-eight villages with 5,800 houses were looted and then burnt. A detailed list of material losses includes 110,000 sheep, 2,400 cattle, 21,000 quintals of wheat and 80,000 quintals of edible oil, amounting to 11,000,000 kilograms of grain and 3,000,000 kilograms of edible oil. As a result of these assaults, an estimated 28,000 Chams fled to Albania.

Leaders
The leaders of Chams were prominent figures of the anti-fascist liberation war in both Chameria battalion and IV "Ali Demi" battalion. Tahir Demi, Ali Demi, was part of the leading group of the Chams, alongside Taho Sejko, Kasim Demi, Rexhep Çami, Vehip Demi, Dervish Dojaka and Hilmi Seiti.

Refugee congresses
In the first years of their exodus in Albania, Chams organized to congresses, aiming to valuate the situation of the expelled population.

First Cham Congress
The first Cham congress was held under difficult circumstances at the end of World War II. It was organized in the town of Konispol, in the Albanian part of Chameria, where thousands of Chams were forcibly expelled by the forces of EDES. The congress was organized in a refugee camp, where Chams had been sheltered, while the town had been liberated by German forces only some months before. In this congress was adopted the memorandum, that was sent to the allied powers and was decided that the only solution to their issue, was their repatriation in Chameria and fair trials for the ones who expelled them.

Second Cham Congress
A year later, after Chams expelled for the second time the Committee organized a second congress on 23 September 1945. Vlora was chosen as the spot for the Second Cham Congress, as it had become a shelter for a majority of Chams, after their exodus, having more than 10 refugee camps. The second congress was finalized with more memorandums, which were sent to the London Peace Conference and to various Allied Military Missions in Albania, requesting the Cham issue be discussed.

Diplomatic activities

In Greece
Chams sent a delegation of the CAFC  to Athens to lodge a protest with the government of George Papandreou. The Cham delegation also delivered protest notes to the Greek National Union, the Mediterranean General Command, the missions of the Allied governments and the Central Committee of the National Liberation Front. The Commission was completely ignored by the Greek authorities.

Greece's official position is at that time that it did not encourage Chams to flee, nor did it oppose their return; it just wanted to try war criminals and collaborators. In 1945, a Greek Special Court on Collaborators condemned 1,930 Chams in absentia (many of them to death), while their immovable property was confiscated by the Greek state. The ownership was not changed, but they were controlled by the Greek National Bank.

In every case, Cham Albanians could not return to Greece, because of the alleged crimes they were charged with and the climate of terror that several nationalist bands, backed by the National Guard, were sustaining in Thesprotia. Also they could not be assured for a fair trial since many who had taken part in the massacres against Chams, now held positions in the Greek Army's Epirus Command. In addition, belonging to opposite political camps, the Chams were unable to ask for their rights.

Internationalizing the issue
At the same time, the Committee tried to internationalize the issue, by sending telegrams of protest to several Allied Powers. The sent telegrams to the Soviet, British, American and French military missions, and the Yugoslav Legation in Tirana. The memorandum, adopted in the first congress, was sent also to the London and Paris Conference of Peace, and to the United Nations Assembly on 25 October 1946. Every telegram and memorandum ended with the plea: "Despite protests we have made and the rights we are entitled to, we continue to be in exile, whereas the Greek government has gone all out to establish aliens in our Chameria in order to prevent us from returning home."

Human relief
Although, no demand of Chams was answered, the UN Assembly in New York City acknowledged the humanitarian crisis facing the refugees. From September 1945 to the spring of 1947, Albania received a total of US$26 million of assorted goods, materials and equipment from the UN Relief Programme, UNRRA (United Nation's Relief and Rehabilitation Administration). Of this approximately US$1.2 million was allocated specifically for refugees from northern Greece. According to historian Miranda Vickers "it was mainly due to this aid programme that Albania escaped a major famine".

Aftermath

In 1951, the Albanian government granted forcefully Cham Albanians the Albanian citizenship and they were forced to integrate to Albanian society, disbanning the Committee. Despite this many Chams still regard themselves as refugees deprived of their Greek citizenship and the right to return to their property in Greece. Until 1991, Cham Albanians had no right to be organized and the Cham Issue was not discussed neither by the Albanian Government, nor by the Greek one.

In 1953, Greece passed a law, that considered the Cham's agricultural properties as abandoned, and thus confiscated them. A year later, all urban properties were confiscated too. In 1974, the Greek citizenship of Cham Albanians taken off them, by the law on refugees.

The Albanian communist government was criticized for its international reactions. Actually, according to historians, the controversial Cham issue has lain dormant in recent years and none of the post-war Albanian governments, whether communist, democratic or socialist, have ventured to try to make it a key issue in bilateral relations with Greece. Many Chams were persecuted by the Albanian Communist regime, which, like the Greeks, believed that they had collaborated with the Italians and Germans during the Second World War. Many were therefore forced to flee to the United States, creating a new diaspora of Cham Albanians.

The Cham issue would regain momentum only in 1991, when the communist regime collapsed, and the National Political Association "Çamëria" was established.

References

See also

Cham Albanians
Chameria